The 1970 NCAA College Division baseball tournament decided the champion of baseball at the NCAA College Division level for the 1970 season. This was the third such tournament for the College Division, having separated from the University Division in 1957.

Format
Fourteen teams were selected to participate, divided into four regions.  Three regions consisted of four teams, while the Midwest Region had two.  Each region completed a double-elimination round, with the winners advancing to the finals.  The finals, made up of the four regional champions, also competed in a double-elimination format.

Regionals

East Regional

Mideast Regional

Midwest Regional

West Regional

Finals

Participants

Results

Bracket

Game results

See also
 1970 NCAA University Division baseball tournament
 1970 NAIA World Series

References

 
NCAA Division II Baseball Tournament
NCAA College Division baseball tournament